Events in the year 1797 in Norway.

Incumbents
Monarch: Christian VII

Events
 The historical local Lagtings and the office of Lawspeaker was abolished.
 11 August - Overhoffretten, the highest court in Norway, was abolished, and replaced with four regional courts.

Arts and literature

Births
13 May - Ulrik Frederik Cappelen, jurist and politician (d.1864)
21 May - Claus Winter Hjelm, judge (d.1871)
24 May - Lars Rasch, jurist and politician (b.1864)
23 September - Johannes Henrik Berg, politician (d.1886)
30 November - Otto Vincent Lange, politician and Minister (d.1870)

Full date unknown
Erik Røring Møinichen, politician and Minister (d.1875)
Christen Smed, blacksmith and mountaineer (d.1846)
Christen Andersen Vallesværd, politician
Ole Høiland, burglar and jail-breaker (d.1848)

Deaths
13 June - Christian Jensen Lofthuus, revolutionary peasant leader (b.1750)

Full date unknown
Hans Strøm, zoologist (b.1726)

See also